Non Non Biyori is an anime television series by Silver Link based on the manga series by Atto, which follows the lives of a group of children who live in the countryside. The first series aired in Japan between October 8 and December 24, 2013 and was simulcast by Crunchyroll. An original video animation episode was bundled with the seventh manga volume released on July 23, 2014. A second season, Non Non Biyori Repeat, aired between July 7 and September 22, 2015. The series is licensed in North America by Sentai Filmworks.

A movie, Non Non Biyori Vacation, premiered on August 25, 2018.

A third season, Non Non Biyori Nonstop, aired from January 11 to March 29, 2021. The staff and cast from the first two anime series are reprising their roles for the season. The third season ran for 12 episodes.

Episode list

Non Non Biyori (2013)

Non Non Biyori Repeat (2015)

Non Non Biyori Vacation (2018)

Non Non Biyori Nonstop (2021)

Notes

References

Non Non Biyori